Victor Manuel Cayo (born November 17, 1984) is a Dominican former professional boxer who competed from 2006 to 2014, and challenged once for the WBA interim super lightweight title in 2010.

Professional career
Cayo made his professional debut on May 8, 2006, scoring a four-round unanimous decision over Hector Bello. For the next four years, Cayo would remain undefeated while fighting mainly in his native Dominican Republic. On March 27, 2010, he fought for his first major world championship—the WBA interim light welterweight title—against fellow hard-hitting puncher Marcos Maidana, who entered as champion. Cayo suffered his professional loss when he was knocked out in the sixth round from a body shot.

Another high-profile fight on July 29, 2011, this time an eliminator for the IBF light welterweight title, saw Cayo getting knocked out by Lamont Peterson in the final few seconds of the last round. Further losses mounted throughout the subsequent years, including a late-rounds stoppage against Nate Campbell on March 24, 2012.

Professional boxing record

References

External links

Dominican Republic male boxers
Light-welterweight boxers
Welterweight boxers
1984 births
Sportspeople from Santo Domingo
Living people